Aurvandill (Old Norse) is a figure in Germanic mythology. In Norse mythology, the god Thor tosses Aurvandill's toe – which had frozen while the thunder god was carrying him in a basket across the Élivágar rivers – into the sky to form a star called  ('Aurvandill's toe'). An Old Danish Latinized version, Horwendillus (Ørvendil), is also the name given to the father of Amlethus (Amleth) in Saxo Grammaticus' Gesta Danorum. Comparative studies of the various myths where the figure is involved have led scholars to reconstruct a Common Germanic mythical figure named , which seems to have personified the 'rising light' of the morning, possibly the Morning Star (Venus). However, the German and – to a lesser extent – the Old Danish evidence remain difficult to interpret in this model.

Name and origin

Etymology 
It is cognate with Old English , Old High German  (≈ ), and Lombardic . The Gothic word , translating the Koine Greek  (eosphoros, 'dawnbringer'), may also be related.

The original meaning of the Common Germanic name remains obscure. The most semantically plausible explanation is to interpret  as a compound meaning 'light-beam' or 'ray of light', by deriving the prefix - from Proto-Germanic  ('shiny [especially of liquids]'; cf. Goth. , ON ). The latter probably stems from the root  ('to turn, wind'), so that the etymological connotation is that of suppleness or flexibility.

Alternatively, the Old Norse prefix  has also been interpreted as coming from Proto-Germanic  ('mud, gravel, sediment'; cf. ON  'wet clay, mud', OE  'earth'), with  being rendered as 'gravel-beam' or 'swamp-wand'. According to philologist Christopher R. Fee, this may imply the idea a phallic figure related to fertility, the name of his spouse in the Old Norse myth, Gróa, literally meaning 'Growth'.

'the shining Vandal'), from a stem  ('beard'), or else compared to a Norse word for sword.

Origin 
Commentators since at least the time of Jacob Grimm's Deutsche Mythologie, first published in 1835, have emphasized the great age of the tradition reflected in the mythological material surrounding this name, without being able to fully reconstruct the motifs of a Common Germanic myth. The task is complicated because the mythical stories of Orendel and Horwendillus appear to be unrelated to that of Ēarendel and Aurvandill. However, some scholars, including Georges Dumézil, have attempted to demonstrate that Saxo's Horwendillus and Snorri's Aurvandill are based on the same archetypal myth. Thus, the Orendel of the Middle High German myth may have been a different figure sharing the same name.

At any rate, scholars Rudolf Simek and John Lindow contend that the linguistic relation between the Old Norse and Old English names may suggest a Common Germanic origin of the myth despite the absence of Aurvandill from the Poetic Edda.

Attestations

Old Norse
The Old Norse  is mentioned once in Norse mythology, in Skáldskaparmál, a book of Snorri Sturluson's 13th-century Prose Edda, where he is described as the husband of the witch Gróa:

Thor went home to Thrúdvangar, and the hone remained sticking in his head. Then came the wise woman who was called Gróa, wife of Aurvandill the Valiant: she sang her spells over Thor until the hone was loosened. But when Thor knew that, and thought that there was hope that the hone might be removed, he desired to reward Gróa for her leech-craft and make her glad, and told her these things: that he had waded from the north over Icy Stream and had borne Aurvandill in a basket on his back from the north out of Jötunheim. And he added for a token, that one of Aurvandill's toes had stuck out of the basket, and became frozen; wherefore Thor broke it off and cast it up into the heavens, and made thereof the star called Aurvandill's Toe. Thor said that it would not be long ere Aurvandill came home: but Gróa was so rejoiced that she forgot her incantations, and the hone was not loosened, and stands yet in Thor's head. Therefore it is forbidden to cast a hone across the floor, for then the hone is stirred in Thor's head.

This passage seems to be part of a larger story where Aurvandill is abducted by the jǫtnar; the thunder-god Thor confronts one of them (Hrungnir in Snorri's version) and eventually liberates Aurvandill, but leaves the scene with the weapon of the jǫtunn stuck in his head.

At the end of the story, Aurvandill's frost-bitten toe is made into a new star by Thor. However, it is not clear what celestial object is indicated in this passage. Guesses as to the identity of this star have included Sirius, the planet Venus, or the blue-white star Rigel, which could be viewed as forming the foot of the constellation Orion.

Gothica Bononiensia
The oldest attestation of this name may occur in the Gothica Bononiensia, a sermon from Ostrogothic Italy written in the Gothic language not later than the first half of the 6th century, and discovered in 2009. On folio 2 recto, in the context of a quotation from Isaiah 14:12, linguist P. A. Kerkhof suggested to see the word  (auzandil) in a difficult-to-read part of the palimpsest. This reading, which has been accepted by various experts such as Carla Falluomini and Roland Schuhmann, translates the Koine Greek word  (heōsphóros, 'dawnbringer') from the Septuagint, which in Latin is rendered lucifer ('light-bringer, morning star'):

...  ...... how Lucifer did fall from heaven, he who emerges in the morning ...

Old English
According to scholar J. E. Cross, textual evidence indicate that it originally meant 'coming or rising light, beginning of light, bringer of light', and that later innovations led to an extended meaning of 'radiance, light'. Philologist Tiffany Beechy writes that "the evidence from the early glossary tradition shows earendel to be a rare alternative for common words for the dawn/rising sun." According to her, the "Anglo-Saxons appear to have known  as a quasi-mythological figure who personified a natural phenomenon (sunrise) and an astrological/astronomical object (the morning star)."

Crist I 
The lines 104–108 of the Old English poem Crist I (Christ I) describe the coming of Ēarendel to the earth:

The impetus of the poem comes from the Latin Advent antiphon:  – "O Orient/Rising One, splendour of eternal light and sun of justice: come and illuminate one sitting in darkness and the shadow of death". Scholars agree that  was chosen in Crist I as an equivalent of the Latin , understood in a religious-poetic context as the 'source of true light', 'the fount of light', and the 'light (which) rises from the Orient'.

Ēarendel is traditionally taken to personify in Crist I either John the Baptist or Christ himself, figuring him as the rising sun, morning star, or dawn. He is portrayed in the poem as the "true(st) light of the sun" and the "brightest of angels [≈ messengers]", implying the idea of a heavenly or divine radiance physically and metaphorically sent over the earth for the benefit of mankind. The lines 107b–8, translated as "all spans of time you, of yourself, enlighten always", or as "you constantly enlighten all seasons by your presence", may also suggest that Ēarendel exists in the poem as an eternal figure situated outside of time, and as the very force that makes time and its perception possible.

Blickling Homilies 
 also appears in the Blickling Homilies (10th c. AD), where he is explicitly identified with John the Baptist:

The passage is based on a Latin sermon by the 5th-century Archbishop of Ravenna Petrus Chrysologus:  – "But since he is about to appear, now let John spring forth, because the birth of Christ follows closely; let the new Lucifer arise, because now the light of the true Sun is breaking forth". Since the Old English version is close to the original Latin,  can be clearly identified in the Blickling Homilies with lucifer, meaning in liturgical language the 'light bearer, the planet Venus as morning star, the sign auguring the birth of Christ'. In this context,  is to be understood as the morning star, the light whose rising signifies Christ’s birth, and whose appearance comes in the poem before the "gleam of the true Sun, God himself".

Glosses 
In the Durham Hymnal Gloss (early 11th c. AD), the term  is used in specific contexts to gloss the Latin aurora ('dawn; east, orient') instead of the more frequent equivalent dægrima ('dawn'), with the hymns 15.8 and 30.1 implying that  appears with the dawn, as the light that "quite suffuses the sky", rather than being the dawn itself ("the dawn comes up in its course,  steps fully forth").

The Épinal Glossary, written in England in the 8th century, associates  with the Latin  ('brightness, radiance' [especially of heavenly bodies]) as an alternative to the more frequent equivalent  (Old English: 'ray of light, gleam'). Two copies of the Épinal Glossary were made in the late 8th or early 9th century: the Épinal-Erfurt Glossary, which gives the equation  (≈ ), and the Corpus Glossary, redacted from an archetype of Épinal-Erfurt exemplar.

German
A Bavarian count named  is recorded in 843.

The Middle High German epic poem Orendel, written in the late 12th century, provides a fictional account of how the Holy Mantle of Christ came to the city of Trier that was probably inspired by the actual transfer of the Mantle to the main altar of Trier Cathedral in 1196. The style of the poem, characterized by its "paratactic organization of episodes and the repetition of poetic formulas", may point to an older oral tradition. The eponymous hero of the tale, Orendel, son of King Ougel, embarks on the sea with a mighty fleet in order to reach the Holy Land and seek the hand of Bride, Queen of Jerusalem. Suffering shipwreck, Orendel is rescued by a fisherman and eventually recovers the lost Mantle in the belly of a whale. The coat provides him protection and he succeeds in winning Bride for his wife. After ruling Jerusalem with Bride for a time, the two of them meet with many adventures. At the end of the story, Orendel finally disposes of the Holy Coat after bringing it to Trier.

The appendix to the Strassburger Heldenbuch (15th c.) names King Orendel (≈ ) of Trier as the first of the heroes that were ever born.

Lombardic 
The Lombardic form  appears as a personal name in the 8th century.

Danish 
A Latinized version of the Old Danish name, Horwendillus (Ørvendil), appears in Saxo Grammaticus' Gesta Danorum (ca. 1200) as the father of Amlethus (Amlet):Now Ørvendil, after controlling the [Jutland] province for three years, had devoted himself to piracy and reaped such superlative renown that Koller, the king of Norway, wishing to rival his eminent deeds and widespread reputation, judged it would suit him very well if he could transcend him in warfare and cast a shadow over the brilliance of this world-famed sea-rover. He cruised about, combing various parts of the seas, until he lit upon Ørvendil's fleet. Each of the pirates had gained an island in the midst of the ocean and they had moored their ships on different sides. (...)

Both gave and accepted their word of honour on this point and fell to battle. They were not deterred from assailing each other with their blades by the novelty of their meeting or the springtime charm of that spot, for they took no heed of these things. Ørvendil's emotional fervour made him more eager to set upon his foe than to defend himself; consequently he disregarded the protection of his shield and laid both hands to his sword. This daring had its results. His rain of blows deprived Koller of his shield by cutting it to pieces; finally he carved off the other’s foot and made him fall lifeless. He honoured their agreement by giving him a majestic funeral, constructing an ornate tomb, and providing a ceremony of great magnificence. After this he hounded down and slew Koller's sister Sæla, a warring amazon and accomplished pirate herself and skilled in the trade of fighting.

Three years were passed in gallant military enterprises, in which he marked the richest and choicest of the plunder for Rørik, to bring himself into closer intimacy with the king. On the strength of their friendship Ørvendil wooed and obtained Rørik's daughter Gerutha for his bride, who bore him a son, Amleth.

In view of Saxo's tendency to euhemerise and reinterpret traditional Scandinavian myths, philologist Georges Dumézil has proposed that his story was based on the same archetype as Snorri's Aurvandill. In what could be a literary inversion of the original myth, Horwendillus is portrayed as a warrior who injures and vanquishes his adversary, whereas Aurvandill was taken as a hostage by the jǫtnar and wounded during his deliverance. Dumézil also notes that, although the event does not take a cosmological turn in Saxo's version, Aurvandill's toe was broken off by Thor, while Collerus' (Koller's) entire foot is slashed off by Horwendillus.

In popular culture
British writer J. R. R. Tolkien discovered the lines 104–105 of Cynewulf's Crist in 1913. According to him, the "great beauty" of the name Ēarendel, and the myth he seems to be associated with, inspired the character of Eärendil depicted in The Silmarillion. In 1914, Tolkien published a poem originally entitled "The Voyage of Earendel the Evening Star" as an account of Ēarendel's celestial course as the bright Morning-star. In a personal letter from 1967, Tolkien wrote:

When first studying A[nglo]-S[axon] professionally (1913) ... I was struck by the great beauty of this word (or name), entirely coherent with the normal style of A-S, but euphonic to a peculiar degree in that pleasing but not 'delectable' language ... it at least seems certain that it belonged to astronomical-myth, and was the name of a star or star-group. Before 1914, I wrote a 'poem' upon Earendel who launched his ship like a bright spark from the havens of the Sun. I adopted him into my mythology in which he became a prime figure as a mariner, and eventually as a herald star, and a sign of hope to men. Aiya Earendil Elenion Ancalima (II 329) 'hail Earendil brightest of Stars' is derived at long remove from Éala Éarendel engla beorhtast.

Tolkien interpreted Ēarendel as a Messenger, probably inspired by his association with the word  ('angel, messenger') in both Crist I (104) and the Blickling Homilies (21 & 35), and his identification with John the Baptist in the latter text. Tolkien's depiction of Eärendil as a Herald also has echoes in the interpretation of the Old English Ēarendel as the Morning-star physically heralding the rising of the sun, which finds a figurative parallel in the Blickling Homilies, where Ēarendel heralds the coming of the "true Sun", Christ. Another pervasive aspect of Tolkien's Eärendil is his depiction as a Mariner. Carl F. Hostetter notes that, although "the association of Eärendil with the sea was for Tolkien a deeply personal one", the Danish Horvandillus and the German Orendel are both portrayed as mariners themselves.

In 2022, a group of scientists led by astronomer Brian Welch named star WHL0137-LS "Earendel" from the Old English meaning.

See also
Iubar
Proto-Germanic folklore
Lucifer

Notes

References

Citations

Bibliography 
Primary sources:

Secondary sources:

Further reading

Characters in Norse mythology
Germanic given names
Amleth
Venusian deities
Dawn gods